Taqi or Taghi is a male Arabic given name and surname. It may refer to:

Compound forms given on further disambiguation pages
Mohammad Taqi (disambiguation)
Taqi al-Din (disambiguation)

Early imams
Muhammad al-Taqi (811 – 835), ninth Shi'a Imam
Taqi Muhammad (813/814 – 839/840), ninth Ismāʿīlī Imam

Male given name
Taqi Arani (1903–1940), Iranian political activist
Taqi Mubarak (born 1978), Omani footballer
Taghi Riahi (1911–1989), Iranian military officer and politician 
Taqi Tabatabaei Qomi (1923–2016), Iranian Twelver Shi'a Marja
Taghi Taghiyev (1917-1993), an Azeri painter

Middle name
Ahmad Taqi Sheikh Mohammed Rashid (1940–1974), Oromo nationalist (Ethiopia)
Mir Taqi Mir (1722–1810), Urdu poet
 Mirza Taghi Khan Amir-Nezam, known as Amir Kabir (1807–1852), chancellor of Iran

Surname
Ridha Jawad Taqi, Iraqi politician

See also
 Taghiyev, a slavicised surname driven from Taqi
 TaqI, bacterial enzyme

Arabic masculine given names
Arabic-language surnames